Denmark competed at the 2004 Summer Paralympics in Athens, Greece. The team included 32 athletes, 22 men and 10 women. Competitors from Denmark won 15 medals, including 5 gold, 3 silver and 7 bronze to finish 29th in the medal table.

Medallists

Sports

Athletics

Men's field

Boccia

Cycling

Women

Equestrian

Individuals

Team

Goalball
The men's goalball team won the gold medal after defeating Sweden in the gold medal match.

Players
Martin Enggaard Pedersen
Kenneth Hansen
Soren Holmgren Jensen
Ricky Nielsen
Peter Weichel

Tournament

Sailing

Shooting

Men

Women

Swimming

Men

Women

Table tennis

Men

See also
Denmark at the Paralympics
Denmark at the 2004 Summer Olympics

References 

Nations at the 2004 Summer Paralympics
2004
Summer Paralympics